Love Time is a 1934 American historical drama film directed by James Tinling and starring Pat Paterson, Nils Asther and Herbert Mundin. The film was released on September 21, 1934, by Fox Film Corporation. The film is a romanticized biopic of the nineteenth century Austrian composer Franz Schubert, released the same year as the similarly-themed British film Blossom Time.

Cast
Pat Paterson as Valerie
Nils Asther as Franz Schubert
Herbert Mundin as Caesar
Harry Green as Adam
Henry B. Walthall as Duke Johann von Hatzfeld
Lucien Littlefield as Willie Obenbiegler
Henry Kolker as Emperor Francis I
Albert Conti as Nicholas
Herman Bing as Istvan
Roger Imhof as Innkeeper
James Burke as Benjamin
Josephine Whittell as Mrs. Obenbiegler
Earle Foxe as Sergeant
Georgia Caine as Countess Bertaud
Mary Blackford as Charlotte Bertaud
Paul England as Prince Frederick

References

Bibliography
 Solomon, Aubrey. The Fox Film Corporation, 1915-1935: A History and Filmography (McFarland, 2011).

External links
 

1934 films
1930s historical drama films
American historical drama films
Fox Film films
Films directed by James Tinling
Films set in Vienna
Films set in the 19th century
American black-and-white films
1934 drama films
Films scored by Samuel Kaylin
Biographical films about musicians
Franz Schubert
1930s English-language films
1930s American films